Charitographa is a genus of moths belonging to the family Tortricidae. It contains only one species, Charitographa mikadonia, which is found in Japan.

References

External links
tortricidae.com

Hilarographini
Moths of Japan
Monotypic moth genera
Tortricidae genera
Taxa named by Alexey Diakonoff